is a former Japanese football player.

Playing career
Minami was born in Oita Prefecture on May 1, 1979. After graduating from high school, he joined Regional Leagues club Nippon Steel Oita based in his local in 1998. In 1999, he moved to Prefectural Leagues club Profesor Miyazaki. In the middle of 1999, he moved to Japan Football League club Mito HollyHock. He played many matches and the club was promoted to J2 League from 2000. He retired end of 2000 season.

Club statistics

References

External links

1979 births
Living people
Association football people from Ōita Prefecture
Japanese footballers
J2 League players
Japan Football League players
Estrela Miyazaki players
Mito HollyHock players
Association football midfielders